The Kwinana Grain Terminal is a grain terminal in East Rockingham, Western Australia. Built from 1969 onwards and operated by the CBH Group, the facility consists of a jetty, two horizontal storages, three silos and four open bulk heads. Grain is transported to the site by rail, stored and eventually loaded onto ships for export.

The facility is a landmark for the Rockingham and Kwinana area and was heritage listed in March 2008. It accounts for over fifty percent of Western Australia's international grain exports.

History
Grain shipments from Western Australia were originally processed from Fremantle Harbour. The Fremantle facility, however, suffered constraints as it could not be enlarged and the harbour could not be deepened to accommodate the increasing size of bulk carriers. The Kwinana Industrial Area, which had been developed since the 1950s, was chosen as the site of a new grain terminal because of the availability of land, the access to a deep water port in Cockburn Sound and the available rail connection.

Construction of the terminal began in 1969 and completed in 1975, at a cost of A$76 million. The first shipment of grain left the terminal 5 July 1977 for the Mexican Gulf. The terminal set an early record of 78,507 tonnes shipped on an individual vessel from Western Australia, MV Bjorgholm, on 22 November 1979, which was not broken until 2014, when a ship carrying just 129 tonnes more left Esperance Port for Saudi Arabia.

The grain terminal component was built on the eastern, landwards side of Rockingham Beach Road, with grain being conveyed underneath the road to the jetty on the western side, thereby maintaining public access to the beach.

A granary museum was established at the terminal in the 1990s.

Jetty
The jetty of the facility, the CBH Grain Jetty, is a single-berth jetty and can load grain at up to 5,000 tonnes per hour. It has a berth length of 291 metres, and four ship loaders. It is part of the Fremantle Outer Harbour.

The jetty can accommodate bulk carriers up to a size of 75,000 tonnes, and, on average, processes 130 shipments per year.

The beach either side of the jetty, the northern end of Rockingham Beach and the southern end of Kwinana Beach, is an off-leash dog exercise area, while the beach north of it is also a horse exercise area until 10am, with horses permitted to swim until noon.

Shipments
In 2019-20, the terminal shipped 6.2 million tonnes of grain, 30,000 tonnes below its all-time shipping record which it set in 2016-17. It accounts for over fifty percent of Western Australia's international grain exports. The facility can receive up to 4,000 tonnes of grain by rail per hour.

References

Grain elevators
CBH Group
East Rockingham, Western Australia
1969 establishments in Australia
Heritage places in Perth, Western Australia
Industrial buildings in Western Australia
Fremantle Harbour